Rožički Vrh is a settlement in the Municipality of Sveti Jurij ob Ščavnici in northeastern Slovenia. It lies on a hill with the same name in the Slovene Hills above the Ščavnica Valley. The area is part of the traditional region of Styria and is now included in the Mura Statistical Region.

References

External links
Rožički Vrh at Geopedia

Populated places in the Municipality of Sveti Jurij ob Ščavnici